{{DISPLAYTITLE:C13H16FNO}}
The molecular formula C13H16FNO (molar mass: 221.28 g/mol) may refer to:

 2-Fluorodeschloroketamine
 3-Fluorodeschloroketamine